The Pappmine or Cardboard Mine in English was an anti-tank mine that was developed by Germany and used by the Wehrmacht during World War II.

Design 
The Pappmine was designed to be a low cost, and easy to produce cardboard anti-tank mine which could relieve pressure on the overstretched metalworking industry. The Pappmine was made entirely of non-metallic materials to prevent detection by electric mine detectors. The Pappmine was a close copy of the Soviet TMB series of cardboard mines except the Pappmine was better waterproofed to resist moisture and rotting. The Pappmine was black in color and consisted of a container with a lid. The lid covered the full diameter of the container and both the top and bottom edges of the container were rounded and held together by a band of cardboard.  In the center of the lid, there was a  pressure plate of thick green glass which resembled a glass stopper. Only pressure on the plate caused an explosion and pressure on the cardboard side of the mine would not set it off.   of pressure on the plate crushed the igniter creating a flash which then passed to the priming charge which exploded the TNT filling. A 3-second delay could also be incorporated in the igniter. The Pappmine relied on blast effect to destroy enemy tanks and it did not have a shaped charge warhead.

References

Anti-personnel mines
World War II weapons of Germany
Land mines of Germany
Weapons and ammunition introduced in 1944